Salem's Seven is a fictional team of magical beings and former supervillains appearing in Marvel Comics. They were initially foes of the Scarlet Witch and the Fantastic Four, but became allies to both. All seven are the children of Nicholas Scratch and the grandchildren of Agatha Harkness. They are humans with magic powers who can transform into fantastic creatures with super-powers.

Publication history
The team first appeared in Fantastic Four #186 (September 1977), and was created by Len Wein and George Pérez.

Fictional history
Salem's Seven originated in New Salem, Colorado, a hidden town in an unsettled part of the Rocky Mountains, populated entirely by magic users who mostly lived in fear of normal humanity due to the persecution they faced during the Salem witch trials. Salem's Seven were fathered by Nicholas Scratch with different mothers. Scratch's own mother Agatha Harkness was the most powerful of the town's inhabitants, but she chose to live among humanity. In time, she becomes the governess for Franklin Richards (son of Invisible Woman and Mister Fantastic of the Fantastic Four). Scratch has Salem's Seven abduct Agatha purportedly for betraying the New Salem community. They bring Franklin back with them to give to Scratch a new host-body, which forces the Fantastic Four to pursue. Although initially overcome and imprisoned, the Four defeat their captors, banish Scratch from this dimension, and save Harkness. When Salem's Seven try to retaliate against Harkness later, she removes their ability to change forms.

Over the years, Salem's Seven manage to reverse the spells locking them away from their enhanced forms, greatly weakening Harkness in the process. They take control of New Salem, and with Vertigo as their leader, they turn the community against Harkness and burn her at the stake. The Scarlet Witch and the Vision are drawn to New Salem, where they are captured by the Seven. Gazelle disagrees with the group's plans of sacrifice, and is thrown in with the prisoners. The Vision escapes and battles Vertigo, who draws the powers of the other 665 residents of New Salem into herself. When the Vision defeats Vertigo, she loses control of the power. The Scarlet Witch manages to channel some of it off, but in the ensuing explosion all of New Salem is apparently wiped out, including the Seven.

The next Halloween, Wanda attempts to commune with Harkness's spirit, but instead is drawn into the land of the dead, where she confronts spirits of the Seven (except Gazelle) who had aligned themselves with a being that called itself Samhain. Wanda defeats Samhain and binds him within the spirits of six of the Seven.

Through samples of their DNA, Brutacus, Hydron, Reptilla, Thornn, and Vakume are later reanimated as some of Arnim Zola's proto-husks. They are all introduced and then promptly slain for humorous effect by Deadpool.

All members of Salem's Seven are resurrected when the Scarlet Witch's mental breakdown and manipulation of magic restore them to life. Scratch manipulates them into releasing Shuma-Gorath, but they later aid the Fantastic Four, Diablo, and Doctor Strange in defeating Scratch and Shuma-Gorath. The seven subsequently live with Doctor Strange and are friends of the Fantastic Four.

In the 2014 New Warriors series, Salem's Seven are seen living as the resident protectors of New Salem, which has become a haven for all people "born of magic".

Through the advice of a mysterious benefactor called Quiet Man, Wizard enlists Gazelle, Reptilla, and Vertigo to join his Frightful Four. They attack Mister Fantastic in Chicago until Scarlet Witch arrives to help him.

During the "Hunted" storyline, Gazelle is among the animal-themed superhumans captured by Taskmaster and Black Ant for Kraven the Hunter's Great Hunt, sponsored by Arcade's company Arcade Industries. In the ensuing chaos, Gazelle is stabbed by a Hunter-Bot controlled by one of the participants.

Members
 Brutacus: Transforms into a lion-like humanoid with red horns. In this form, he has strength and durability sufficient to match the Thing or Vision.
 Gazelle: Transforms into a cloven-hoofed deer-like person with super-speed and agility.
 Hydron: Transforms into a fish-man who can fire controllable streams of water from the stump-end of his left arm.
 Reptilla: Transforms into a snake-like form with a single long snake tail instead of legs, and two poisonous snakes instead of her arms. She can constrict and bite with her hand-snakes.
 Thornn: Transforms into a yellow demon-like humanoid with large red thorns jutting from the arms and legs. He can throw explosive thorns or stunning thorns.
 Vakume: Transforms into a featureless purple humanoid. He can become intangible and control air, creating winds and vacuums.
 Vertigo: Eldest daughter of Scratch with no special transformation. She is not the same character as Vertigo of the Savage Land Mutates, but possesses the same ability to attack a person's sense of balance.

Other versions

Ultimate Marvel
Appearing in Ultimate Fantastic Four and operating out of Salem, Oregon, the Seven are a new superhero team. Although they save many people, they are just as quick to fight the Fantastic Four. Members include:

 Alpha Dog: Leader of the Seven. He can alter the density of objects to make it appear he has super strength and invulnerability.
 Ghostware: Member of the Seven who can phase others and self through solid matter.
 Neuropath: Member of the Seven with emotional induction that can control others' emotions.
 Penultimate: Member of the Seven with cybernetically-enhanced body and high-tech weaponry.
 Primal Screamer: Member of the Seven with powerful vocal blasts.
 Filament: Member of the Seven who creates hyper-dimensional threads which cut through all matter
 Synchron: Member of the Seven who can alter probability in such a way that he can be in several positions at once, attacking from many directions.

In issue #56, it is revealed that the group are one being: a creature known as the Dragon-of-Seven that can separate into multiple forms. As a single entity, the Dragon-of-Seven takes the form of Agatha Harkness. The Dragon-of-Seven poses as Harkness in order to make the Fantastic Four doubt how they work as a team, and as the Seven so that they would doubt even further, as part of a plot to kidnap the Human Torch, to force him to explode, and give birth to more just like him. The Dragon-of-Seven is killed when the Invisible Woman finds a way to reverse the heat waves, so that the Dragon-of-Seven, in the form of the Seven, explodes instead.

In other media
Salem's Seven appeared in The Avengers: United They Stand episode "The Sorceress Apprentice". Alongside Nicholas Scratch, they kidnap Agatha Harkness. Scarlet Witch and Vision fight them while the other Avengers fight Grim Reaper.

References

External links
 Salem's Seven at Marvel Wiki
 Salem's Seven at Comic Vine
 
 Villains of Marvel Comics article on Salem's Seven
 Marvel Directory's article on Salem's Seven

Marvel Comics witches
Marvel Comics characters who use magic
Marvel Comics supervillain teams
Fantastic Four characters